"4 Minutes" is a 2008 song by Madonna featuring Justin Timberlake and Timbaland.

4 Minutes or Four Minutes may also refer to:
 Four Minutes, a 2006 German drama film
 4Minute, a South Korean girl group
 "4 Minutes", a song by Avant from Director
 "Four Minutes", a song by Roger Waters from Radio K.A.O.S.

See also
 Four-minute mile, the running of a mile (1,609.344 metres, 1,760 yards) in four minutes or less
 Four-minute warning, a public alert system conceived by the British Government during the Cold War